Lacerta media is a species of lizard in the family Lacertidae.
It is found in Georgia, Armenia, Azerbaijan, Iran, Turkey, Israel, Jordan, Syria, Lebanon and Russia.

References

 
Reptiles of Russia
Fauna of Georgia (country)
Reptiles described in 1920
Taxa named by Amédée Louis Lantz
Taxa named by August Otto Cyrén